Hena Das (February 12, 1924July 20, 2009) was a Bangladeshi women's right activist and leftist. She was involved in Nankar Movement in 1948 and  Bangladesh Liberation War in 1971. In 2001 she was awarded Begum Rokeya Padak by the Government of Bangladesh for empowering women and raising women's issues.

Early life and education
Das was born in Sylhet town to her father lawyer Roy Bahadur Satishchandra Datta and her mother Manorama Datta. She passed matriculation examination in 1940 from Government Agragami Girls' High School (later Pilot School), intermediate exam in 1942, and obtained bachelor's degree from Sylhet Mahila College in 1947. She earned her master's degree in Bangla in 1966 from University of Dhaka.

Career
Das joined All India Communist Party in 1942 and later was involved with its successor Communist Party of Bangladesh (CPB). She got involved with the Teachers' Association in 1978 and was the elected general secretary and vice president for 14 years. She served as one of the members of the first education commission headed by Muhammad Qudrat-i-Khuda.

Das served as the President of Bangladesh Mohila Parishad (BMP) for eight years after the death of Begum Sufia Kamal in 1999.

Das died on July 20, 2009, in Bangabandhu Sheikh Mujib Medical University. She was cremated with state honor in Narayanganj.

Personal life
In 1948 Das married another communist leader Rohinee Das. They had a daughter Champa Zaman.

Works
 Smritimoy Dingulo (2004) 
 Amar Shikkha O Shikkhokota Jibon
 Smritimoy Ekattor
 Pancham Purush
 Char Purusher Kahini

References

1924 births
2009 deaths
Bangladeshi feminists
University of Dhaka alumni
Recipients of Begum Rokeya Padak